Honey Boy may refer to:

People
Honeyboy Edwards (1915–2011), American Delta blues guitarist and singer from Mississippi
George "Honey Boy" Evans (1870–1915), Welsh-born songwriter and vaudeville entertainer
Honey Boy Martin (born c. 1949), Jamaican reggae singer on 2001's How to Cut and Paste Mix Tape Vol.2
Honey Boy (singer) (born c. 1955), Jamaican-born English reggae singer best known for his recordings in 1970s

Other uses
Honey Boy (song), Tin Pan Alley song for voice and piano written by Jack Norworth and composed by Albert Von Tilzer first published in 1907
Honey Boy (film), 2019 American drama